The Boise State–Nevada football rivalry is a college football rivalry between the Boise State Broncos football team of Boise State University and Nevada Wolf Pack football team of University of Nevada, Reno. The game has been played annually since 1971, with the exception of 1978, 1992, 1995, 2000, 2015–2016 and 2019–2020. The teams met twice in 1990 as the second game was a Division I-AA semifinal playoff game; it remains the only post-season game played between the two programs.

The series has often been a conference match-up, with the exception of ten games: 1971–1977, 1993–1994 and 2011. Boise State and Nevada have met as conference rivals in four conferences—Big Sky, Big West, Western Athletic and Mountain West. These have included three NCAA classifications: Division II (originally "college division"), Division I-AA (now FCS) and Division I FBS.

Since the Mountain West's expansion to twelve football members in 2013, the rivalry is no longer played annually. The conference split into two six-team divisions for football, with Boise State placed in the Mountain Division and Nevada in the West Division. Future MW football schedules include five divisional games and three cross-division games, with no permanent cross-division opponents. In a four-year cycle, teams in opposite divisions play only twice (two seasons on and two off, or vice versa). They played in 2013–2014 and 2017–2018, but not in 2015–2016 and 2019–2020. They can still meet in the Mountain West Championship game.

Notable games
 December 8, 1990: Division I-AA semifinal, triple overtime, Nevada advanced to the national title game.
 November 25, 2006: Boise State victory to complete a perfect regular season and earn a BCS bowl bid.
 October 14, 2007: Highest scoring game in the history of the series, 69–67 in four overtime periods. The 136 points is the second most combined points in an FBS game (tied with the Navy vs North Texas on November 10, 2007).
 November 26, 2010: Nevada's overtime victory ended previously undefeated Boise State's BCS hopes.

Game results

 Non-conference games (11: 1971–1977, 1990 (playoff), 1993–1994 and 2011)
 Second meeting in 1990 was Division I-AA semifinal; Nevada won in triple overtime
 Three overtime games: 1990 playoff (3OT), 2007 (4OT) and 2010 (OT)
 Not played in 8 seasons (1978, 1992, 1995, 2000, 2015–2016 and 2019–2020)

Coaching records

Since first game on September 25, 1971

Boise State

Nevada

 Chris Ault's overall record in series is 8–18–0
 There have been no ties in this series; Big Sky went to overtime for conference games in 1980& all Division I games went to overtime in 1996.

See also

 List of NCAA college football rivalry games

References

1971 establishments in Idaho
1971 establishments in Nevada
Boise State Broncos football
College football rivalries in the United States
Nevada Wolf Pack football
Recurring sporting events established in 1971